Arbos may refer to:

People 
 Philippe Arbos (1882–1956), French geographer

Companies 
 Arbos - an Italian agricultural machinery company

See also 
 Arbós